Newtown Linford is a linear village in Leicestershire, England. The population of the civil parish was 1,000 at the 2001 census, including Ulverscroft, increasing to 1,103 at the 2011 census.

The village lies in a valley in the Charnwood Forest area, and has four access roads. The first is from Anstey, then there are roads which lead to the A50 at Groby and at Markfield (the former passing Groby Pool). Another road that leads north towards Ulverscroft, or Loughborough, Woodhouse, Woodhouse Eaves, Swithland etc.

History
The village's name originates from the relocation of people when the Ferrers family of Groby turned Bradgate into a deer park. The people who lived within the estate were moved to the "New Town" - or hamlet as it would have been then, at the ford of the river Lin (once located at the junction of Markfield Lane and Main Street). The village was first documented in 1293 and was previously known as "Lyndynford". The villagers were all tenants of the Ferrers family, and later the Grey family.

The village is famous for Bradgate Park, a large country park which was home to Lady Jane Grey, Queen for nine days. Bradgate Park is a popular destination for days out in Leicestershire, home to several herds of deer, and children are often seen paddling in the shallow river Lin, which runs through it. There are a few shops (mainly aimed at the day-trippers who come to Bradgate Park) but the garden centre which used to dominate the centre of the village closed in 2004 and has been built on for housing.  All of the properties in the village belonged to the Grey Estate until 1925 when it was sold off. Much of the village was designated a conservation area in 1972, and there are 32 listed buildings in the village which include the old style red telephone box.

Local area
There is one pub in the village - The Bradgate and one Club The Linford. There is a primary school which celebrated its centenary in 2007, and various restaurants (including Gibson's Grey Lady).  In 2008 the Louis Scott Restaurant opposite the Park gates changed ownership and became the Village Restaurant putting it in the same family ownership as Gibson's Grey Lady Restaurant.   The Johnscliffe Hotel was demolished a few years ago to make way for housing.

Bradgate Park attracts walkers and cyclists, and in the summer the village is often full of day-trippers from all around Leicestershire. There are three cafes, the Jade Tea Rooms, the Post Office Cafe and the Marion Cafe which was named after Marion Richardson who used to live there. The Post Office itself was closed in 2008 but remains a newsagent as well as a cafe.  There is also a cafe in the Deer Barn in the centre of Bradgate Park.

The River Lin runs through the village, before flowing through Bradgate Park and joining the reservoir at Cropston.

Newtown Linford boasts a large number of old cottages with a lot of character - especially between Groby Lane and Markfield Lane. At the end of Groby Lane is the village cricket pitch. All Saints Church (built c.1400) is next to the cricket pitch, but the village cemetery lies at the top of the hill on Groby Lane. The churchyard includes a gravestone inscribed with the letters of the alphabet and numerals, said to have been a practice stone purchased by a miserly man to save on the cost of getting a stone inscribed.

The village's cricket club plays in Division One of the Leicestershire & Rutland Cricket League, Second Team in Division Four and Thirds in Division Nine. They are ECB Clubmark accredited.

They also operate a Sunday team, a Thursday League evening side and Under 10s, 13s, 15s & 17s. Players of all abilities are welcome.

In 2015 the Club were the winners of the Yorkshire Tea Cricket Tea Challenge and as part of their prize hosted a PCA Masters XI in front of almost 1,000 spectators at their Main Street ground.

Newtown Linford is also home to one of Britain's surviving police boxes. This box is a listed building and is still used by the local Police beat team today.

Governance
Newtown Linford is located within the Charnwood parliamentary constituency, currently represented by Edward Argar. It is within the Bradgate County Electoral Division and is represented on Leicestershire County Council by Councillor Deborah Taylor. It is within the Forest Bradgate ward of Charnwood Borough Council, on which is represented by Councillor David Snartt.
Newtown Linford is twinned with Plateau Est de Rouen in France,

References

External links

Newtown Linford Parish Council

Villages in Leicestershire
Civil parishes in Leicestershire
Borough of Charnwood